We've Come a Long Way, Baby is the thirty-first solo studio album by American country music singer-songwriter Loretta Lynn. It was released on January 15, 1979, by MCA Records.

Commercial performance 
The album peaked at No. 19 on the Billboard Top Country Albums chart. The album's first single, "We've Come a Long Way, Baby", peaked at No. 10 on the Billboard Hot Country Songs chart. The second single, "I Can't Feel You Anymore", peaked at No. 3.

Recording 
Recording sessions for the album took place at Bradley's Barn in Mount Juliet, TN. There were no sessions specifically for this album. The earliest recording featured on the album is "True Love Needs to Keep in Touch", from a March 5, 1973 session for 1973's Love Is the Foundation. "My Conscience Goes to Sleep" was recorded on June 20, 1974, during a session for They Don't Make 'Em Like My Daddy. "The Lady That Lived Here Before" was the third song to be released from the October 8, 1974 session. "Easy Street" was recorded during a December 17, 1974 session for 1975's Back to the Country. Two songs were from sessions for 1976's Somebody Somewhere; "Lullabies to a Memory" and "We've Come a Long Way, Baby", recorded on June 28 and June 29, 1976 , respectively. "Between the Preacher and the Lawyer" was the third song to be released from the September 29, 1976 session. The newest recordings to be featured on the album were "I Can't Feel You Anymore" and "Standing at Our Bedroom Door", both recorded on February 3, 1978.

Track listing

Chart positions 
Album – Billboard (North America)

Singles – Billboard (North America)

References 

1979 albums
Loretta Lynn albums
Albums produced by Owen Bradley
MCA Records albums